This is a list of transactions that have taken place during the 2018 NBA off-season and the 2018–19 NBA season.

Retirement

Front office movements

Head coach changes
Off-season

In-Season

General manager changes
Offseason

In-season

Player movements

Trades

† Two-way contract

Free agents

* Player option
** Team option
*** Early termination option
**** Previously on a two-way contract
***** Converted two-way contract to full contract

Two-way contracts
Per recent NBA rules implemented as of the 2017–18 season, teams are permitted to have two two-way players on their roster at any given time, in addition to their 15-man regular season roster. A two-way player will provide services primarily to the team's G League affiliate, but can spend up to 45 days with the parent NBA team. Only players with four or fewer years of NBA experience are able to sign two-way contracts, which can be for either one season or two. Players entering training camp for a team have a chance to convert their training camp deal into a two-way contract if they prove themselves worthy enough for it. Teams also have the option to convert a two-way contract into a regular, minimum-salary NBA contract, at which point the player becomes a regular member of the parent NBA team. Two-way players are not eligible for NBA playoff rosters, so a team must convert any two-way players it wants to use in the playoffs, waiving another player in the process. Two-way contracts must be signed prior to January 15, with their salaries being fully guaranteed on January 20.

 °Training camp conversion

Going to other American and Canadian leagues

Going overseas

Waived

† Two-way contract

Training camp cuts
All players listed did not make the final roster.

Draft

First round

Second round

Previous years' draftees

Renounced draft rights

See also

Notes

References

Transactions
2018-19